Aclare is a village in County Sligo, Ireland, and the main village in the parish of Kilmactigue. Formerly, the village of Aclare was not part of the same-named townland, but straddled the border of the adjacent townlands of Lislea and Carns, though later the borders of the townland were extended to encompass the village. The village is situated on the Inagh (also spelt "Eignagh") river, a tributary of the Moy.

The village, as well as the surrounding townlands, is known for its musicians and singers, particularly in Irish traditional music.

An annual St Patrick's Day parade is held in the area.

Belclare Castle is a ruined castle located within sight of the village. The castle is located about half a mile west of Kilmactigue Chapel and was originally built and inhabited by the O'Hara clan in the 15th century.

Transport
Bus Éireann Fridays-only route 479 links Aclare with Sligo via Tourlestrane, Coolaney and Collooney.

People
Tommy Fleming, singer who was born in Aclare.

See also
 List of towns and villages in Ireland

References

Towns and villages in County Sligo